Deportations of the Ingrian Finns were a series of mass deportations of the Ingrian Finnish population by Soviet authorities. Deportations took place from the late 1920s to the end of World War II. They were part of the Genocide of the Ingrian Finns.

Background
Lutheran Finns had lived in Ingria for over 400 years, since the period of Swedish rule. They had immigrated there from Finland and the Karelian Isthmus and eventually started referring to themselves as Ingrian Finns. In 1919 the population of the Ingrian Finns was 132,000 in Ingria and an additional 10,000 in Petrograd. The Finnish-Soviet peace treaty of 1920 had granted Ingrian Finns a degree of national autonomy. A national district was formed in 1928 and Finnish was used in schools, radio and administration.

Deportations

Soviet repression of the Ingrian Finns started at the same time as the forced collectivization in the Soviet Union in 1928. Between 1929 and 1931 Soviet authorities deported 18,000 people from areas near the Finnish border, consisting of up to 16% of the total Ingrian Finnic population. All remaining Finns in four border parishes were deported in 1936 and replaced with Russians. In 1937 all Finnish-language schools, publications, broadcasts, and Ingrian Lutheran churches were closed down. During the 1937–1938 Finnish Operation of the NKVD, 4,000 Ingrian Finns were shot and over 10,000 deported to prison camps. By 1939 the Ingrian Finnish population had decreased to about 115,000, which was about 10% reduction compared to the 1926 population figures and the Ingrian Finn national district was abolished.

Following the German invasion of the Soviet Union and the beginning of the Leningrad Blockade, in early 1942 all 20,000 Ingrian Finns remaining in Soviet-controlled territory were deported to Siberia. Most of the Ingrian Finns living in German-occupied territory were evacuated to Finland in 1943–1944. After Finland sued for peace, it was forced to return the evacuees. Soviet authorities did not allow the 55,733 people who had been handed over to settle back in Ingria, and instead deported them to central regions of Russia. The main regions of Ingrian Finns forced settlement were the interior areas of Siberia, Central Russia, and Tajikistan.

Aftermath
The deportations led to the rapid ethnic assimilation of Ingrian Finns. After 1956, return to Ingria was officially allowed but made unfeasible in practice; as a result, many settled in the nearby Finnic regions of Estonia and Karelia. In 1989 there were 18,000 Finns in Ingria and Leningrad, and a total of 67,813 in the Soviet Union, with only 34.7 percent declaring Finnish as their main language. Ingrian and other Finns were not differentiated in the official census. With the collapse of the Soviet Union, attempts began to revive Ingrian Finnish cultural life in Ingria, but at the same time, many of them moved to Finland.

See also
Population transfer in the Soviet Union
Forced settlements in the Soviet Union
Genocide of the Ingrian Finns

References

Bibliography

Ingrian Finns
Ingrian Finns
Political repression in the Soviet Union
Ethnic cleansing in Europe
Soviet World War II crimes
Human rights in the Soviet Union
Ingria
Baltic Finns